Sheyfan Sofla (also Romanized as Sheyfān Soflá; also known as Sheykhān-e Soflá and Sheykhān-e Dāvūd Khūnī-ye Soflá) is a village in Zaz-e Sharqi Rural District, Zaz va Mahru District, Aligudarz County, Lorestan Province, Iran. At the 2006 census, its population was 59, in 9 families.

References 

Towns and villages in Aligudarz County